Quercus inopina, the sandhill oak, is an uncommon North American species of oak shrub. It has been found only in the state of Florida in the southeastern United States.

It is a branching shrub up to 5 meters (17 feet) in height. The bark is gray, twigs purplish brown.

References

External links
Lady Bird Johnson Wildflower Center, University of Texas

inopina
Endemic flora of Florida
Plants described in 1929